Allstate is an insurance company.

Allstate may also refer to:

Companies
 Allstate Northern Ireland
 Allstate vehicles

Places
 Allstate Arena

Automobile
 Allstate (automobile)
 Allstate (vehicle brand)

Sports events
 Allstate Sugar Bowl
 2010 Allstate Sugar Bowl 
 2009 Allstate Sugar Bowl
 2008 Allstate Sugar Bowl
 2009 Allstate 400 at the Brickyard
 2008 Allstate 400 at the Brickyard
 2007 Allstate 400 at the Brickyard
 2008 Allstate BCS National Championship Game